The 1928 United States presidential election in New York took place on November 6, 1928. All contemporary 48 states were part of the 1928 United States presidential election. State voters chose 45 electors to the Electoral College, which selected the president and vice president. 

New York was won by Republican Secretary of Commerce Herbert Hoover of California, who was running against Democratic Governor of New York Alfred E. Smith. Hoover's running mate was Senate Majority Leader Charles Curtis of Kansas, while Smith's running mate was Senator Joseph Taylor Robinson of Arkansas. 

Hoover won with a plurality of 49.79 percent of the vote to Smith's 47.44 percent, a margin of 2.35 points. Socialist candidate Norman Thomas finished a distant third, with 2.44 percent. Although New York was Al Smith's home state and he had been elected governor there, the 1920s were a fiercely Republican decade in American politics, and New York during the Fourth Party System was a fiercely Republican state in presidential elections. In 1928, Herbert Hoover was winning the third consecutive nationwide Republican landslide, and the economic boom and social good feelings of the Roaring Twenties under popular Republican leadership proved too much for Smith to overcome both nationally and in his home state. 

However, Smith's performance in New York was still impressive in the context of the 1920s, and highly significant in shaping the state's political development. In the elections preceding 1928, New York had been more Republican than the nation as a whole, even in the nationwide Republican landslides of 1920 and 1924. Smith's narrow 2-point defeat in the midst of the nationwide Republican landslide of 1928 made New York State 15% more Democratic than the national average. Smith's 47.44 percent was also the highest vote share a Democratic presidential candidate had received in New York State since former New York Governor Grover Cleveland won the state in 1892, as Woodrow Wilson only won the state with 41% in 1912 when the Republican vote was split.

Smith dramatically improved upon how Democrats before him had done and laid the groundwork for turning the state Democratic in 1932 and beyond. In 1920 and 1924, Republicans had swept every county in New York State and Democrats had received less than 30% of the vote. In 1928, Smith came within 2 points of winning the state by sweeping all five boroughs of heavily populated New York City, winning the state capital of Albany and Albany County along with neighboring Rensselaer County, and winning two counties in northern New York along the Saint Lawrence River, Clinton County and Franklin County. 

Key to Smith's strength in New York State was his sweep of the five massively populated boroughs of New York City. A New York City native, Smith took over 60% of the vote in Manhattan and the Bronx, and also won majorities in Brooklyn, Queens, and Staten Island. Up to this point, 1928 was the strongest victory ever for a Democrat in the city. Smith, a Roman Catholic of Irish, Italian, and German immigrant heritage, held special appeal to Catholic and ethnic immigrant communities that populated cities like New York and Boston. The first Catholic to be nominated on a major-party ticket, Smith's Catholicism would severely weaken his candidacy in many rural parts of the country, especially in the South, but would prove an asset in appealing to voters in New York. The urban, ethnic coalition that delivered New York City to Al Smith would prove to be a harbinger of long-term realignment of both the city and the state toward the Democratic Party. 1928 began a Democratic winning streak in New York City that has never been broken since, as New York City would be solidified as one of the most Democratic cities in the United States, and a major obstacle to overcome for any Republican seeking to compete in New York State. 1928 also turned the state capital of Albany, which had previously been a Republican city, into a Democratic bastion in upstate New York. 

Hoover, for his part, was able to hold on to New York State's electoral votes in 1928 by sweeping much of traditionally staunchly Republican upstate New York and Long Island, where efforts from Hoover's future successor Franklin D. Roosevelt could not swing dry, Protestant Yankee voters to Smith. In addition, the turnout and vote number margins were not yet there in New York City in 1928 to overcome Republican dominance in the rest of the state. In 1932, Franklin D. Roosevelt would build on Smith's coalition to flip New York State into the Democratic column, winning the state with virtually the same county map as Smith, but with stronger vote number margins and turnout. After 1928, New York state would not vote Republican again until 1948.

Results

Results by county

See also
 United States presidential elections in New York
 Presidency of Herbert Hoover

References

New York
1928
1928 New York (state) elections